Camiguin Airport (Cebuano: Tugpahanan sa Camiguin)  is an airport serving the general area of Mambajao, located in the province of Camiguin in the Philippines.  It is the only airport in the province of Camiguin.  

The airport is classified as a Class 2 principal (minor domestic) airport by the Civil Aviation Authority of the Philippines, a body of the Department of Transportation that is responsible for the operations of not only this airport but also of all other airports in the Philippines except the major international airports.

The airport has a  passenger terminal capable of handling 200 passengers at a time, or 300,000 passengers annually.

Airlines and destinations

References

Airports in the Philippines
Buildings and structures in Camiguin